Haithem Fahmy Mahmoud (born 23 September 1991 in Alexandria) is a Greco-Roman wrestler from Egypt who competes in the 59 kg category. He took up wrestling in 2000 and won the African Championships in 2014 and 2015. At the 2016 Olympics he was eliminated in the first bout. He represented Egypt at the 2020 Summer Olympics in the 60kg category.

References

External links
 

1991 births
Living people
Olympic wrestlers of Egypt
Wrestlers at the 2016 Summer Olympics
Egyptian male sport wrestlers
Mediterranean Games gold medalists for Egypt
Mediterranean Games medalists in wrestling
Competitors at the 2013 Mediterranean Games
Competitors at the 2019 African Games
African Games medalists in wrestling
African Games gold medalists for Egypt
African Wrestling Championships medalists
Wrestlers at the 2020 Summer Olympics
Sportspeople from Alexandria
21st-century Egyptian people